Leila Benn Harris (born 1983) is a British actress and soprano singer. She trained at Arts Educational School in London and graduated with a BA in Musical Theatre. Upon graduation, she was cast in the lead role of Carmen in the No.1 National Tour of Fame. She then made her West-End debut in the same role at the Aldwych Theatre. 
She understudied and played the role of The Mistress in Andrew Lloyd Webber’s West-End revival of Evita at the Adelphi Theatre, directed by Michael Grandage. She was also part of the original cast recording.

Leila then starred as Christine in The Phantom of the Opera at Her Majesty’s Theatre, for which she was nominated for a 2008 Whatsonstage.com Theatregoers’ Choice Award for Best Takeover in a Role. To follow, Leila starred in the 2008 Production Imagine This at the New London Theatre in the title role of Rebecca, for which she was nominated for her second 2008 Whatsonstage.com Theatregoers' Choice Award, this time for Best Leading Actress in a Musical.

Other theatre performances include: the title role of Emily in From Up Here at Trafalgar Studios 2 and Liberation Day at The National Theatre Studio. 
 
She completed several workshops of the Cat Stevens musical Moonshadow in which she played the lead role of Anees, and appeared in Chess in Concert with Idina Menzel & Josh Groban, to be released on DVD.

She then completed the run of John Doyle's revival of Oklahoma! at The Chichester Festival Theatre -playing the title role of Laurey.

Then, she appeared in the critically acclaimed Enron at The Noël Coward Theatre in association with The Royal Court, directed by Rupert Goold.

Stage credits

Plays
Enron (Newsreader/Prostitute), Noël Coward Theatre and National UK Tour

Musicals
Les Miserables (Eponine), MCC Malta
Evita, Adelphi Theatre
The Phantom of the Opera" (Christine), Her Majesty's Theatre
2008 Whatsonstage.com Theatregoers Choice Nomination - Best Takeover in a RoleImagine This (Rebecca), New London Theatre
2008 Whatsonstage.com Theatregoers Choice Nomination - Best Leading Actress in a MusicalOklahoma! (Laurey), Chichester Festival TheatreLiberation Day, The National Theatre StudioFrom Up Here (Emily), Trafalgar Studios 2

TelevisionManchild (Chica), BBCIdentity, BBC

RadioFriday Night Is Music Night'', BBC

Discography

References

Living people
English musical theatre actresses
English women singers
1983 births
21st-century English actresses